Sodium sulfosuccinate esters are organic compounds with the formula NaO3SCH(CO2R')CH2CO2R where R and R' can be H or alkyl groups.  They comprise a large class of surfactants and emulsifiers used in cosmetics, pharmaceuticals, and cleaning agents.  They are colorless salts.  These materials can be further classified into monoesters (R' = H, R = alkyl) and diesters (R and R' = alkyl).

Synthesis
They are produced by treatment of maleic anhydride with alcohols.  The resulting mono or diesters are then treated with sodium sulfite, which, concomitant with protonation, adds to the C=C bond.

Application
A high volume example is sodium bis(2-ethylhexyl) sulfosuccinate. This is perhaps best known as the laxative docusate, however its main use is as a surfactant for which it finds common use in personal-care and household-care products, often under the name Aerosol-OTs. It is unusual in that it is able to form microemulsions without the use of co-surfactants, and it has a rich variety of aqueous-phase behavior including multiple liquid crystalline phases.

References

Anionic surfactants
Sulfonic acids